Frédéric R. Kirschleger (7 January 1804 in Munster, Haut-Rhin – 15 November 1869) was a French physician and botanist.

Following studies in Strasbourg, he worked as an intern of pharmacy, first in Ribeauvillé, afterwards in the dispensary at Hôpital Civil of Strasbourg. In 1827-28 he studied medicine in Paris, receiving his doctorate with a thesis on the mineral waters of Vosges. In 1829 he returned to his hometown of Munster as a doctor, resigning from this position several years later in order to become a professor of botany at the school of pharmacy in Strasbourg (1834).

In 1845 he founded the Société d'Horticulture du Bas-Rhin (Horticultural Society of Bas-Rhin), and in 1862 established the Société philomathique vogésorhénane (Philomatic Society of the Vosgés-Rhine).

Among his numerous writings is a highly regarded work on the flora of Alsace and neighboring regions, "Flore d’Alsace et des contrées limitrophes", published in three volumes from 1852 to 1862:
 Flore d'Alsace et des contrées limitrophes 1, Les plantes dicotyles pétalées, (1852).
 Flore d'Alsace et des contrées limitrophes 2, Les monochlamydées, les monocotylées, les cryptogames vasculaires, (1857).
 Flore d'Alsace et des contrées limitrophes 3, La géographie botanique des régions rhénano-vosgiennes, (1862).

In 1835 the botanical genus Kierschlegeria (family Onagraceae) was named in his honor by botanist Édouard Spach.

References 

1804 births
1869 deaths
People from Haut-Rhin
19th-century French botanists
French pharmacists